Montmagny—L'Islet was a federal electoral district in Quebec, Canada, that was represented in the House of Commons of Canada from 1935 to 1968.

This riding was created in 1933 from L'Islet and Montmagny ridings.

It initially consisted of:
 the county of Montmagny, Île-aux-Grues and adjoining Islands, except such part of the said county of Montmagny included in the municipalities of Berthier and Saint-François-de-la-Rivière-du-Sud;
 the county of L'Islet, except such part thereof as is included in the municipalities of Ashford, Sainte-Louise, Saint-Roch-des-Aulnaies, Saint-Perpétue and Tourville.

In 1947, it was redefined to consist of:
 the county of Montmagny (except the municipalities of Berthier and Saint-François-de-la-Rivière-du-Sud), and the town of Montmagny and the municipality of L'Île-aux-Grues;
the county of L'Islet except the municipalities of Ashford, Sainte-Louise, Saint-Roch-des-Aulnaies, Sainte-Perpétue, Tourville and the territory included in the parish of Sainte-Félicité.

In 1952, it was redefined to consist of:
 the county of Montmagny (except the parish municipalities of Berthier and Saint-François-de-la-Rivière-du-Sud), the town of Montmagny and the parish municipality of Saint-Antoine L'Ile-aux-Grues;
 the county of L'Islet (except the township municipality of Ashford, the parish municipality of Sainte-Louise, the municipalities of Saint-Roch-des-Aulnaies, Tourville and Sainte-Félicité) and that part of the parish municipality of Sainte-Perpétue included in lots 13 to 56 of Range VIII, Lafontaine Township.

It was abolished in 1966 when it was redistributed between Bellechasse and Kamouraska.

Members of Parliament

This riding elected the following Members of Parliament:

Election results

See also 

 List of Canadian federal electoral districts
 Past Canadian electoral districts

External links
Riding history from the Library of Parliament

Former federal electoral districts of Quebec
Montmagny, Quebec